The Morane-Saulnier M.S.225 was a French fighter aircraft of the 1930s. It was produced in limited quantities to be used as a transitional aircraft between the last of the biplanes and the first monoplane fighters.

Design and development
The M.S.225 was a parasol monoplane, with a wide fixed landing gear, and powered by a Gnome-Rhône 9Krsd radial engine. Having a circular fuselage the M.S.225 was much more robust than its immediate predecessor, the M.S.224.

Created as a stop-gap before the introduction of more advanced aircraft still under development, the Morane-Saulnier M.S.225 was first shown in the form of a model at the Paris Air Show of 1932. After successful flight tests of the prototype, series production started at once.

Classified in the category C.1 (single-seat fighter), 75 aircraft were produced. A total of 53 aircraft were delivered to the Air Force in November 1933. The Aéronavale received the first of the 16 aircraft it had ordered in February 1934. Three were also sold to China.

Operational history
The M.S.225s of the Armée de l'Air served in the 7e Escadre de Chasse (7th Fighter Wing) at Dijon, and in two escadrilles of the 42e Escadre (42nd Wing), based at Rheims. They were withdrawn from front-line service between 1936 and 1937. The aircraft also flew with the Aéronavale l'Escadrille 3C1, established in Marignane, this formation later transferring to the Air Force at the beginning of 1936, where it became Le Groupe de Chasse II/8.

The Air Force Aerobatic Squadron based at Étampes used five modified M.S.225s, with a larger vertical stabilizer, while the last unit of the Air Force to operate this aircraft was the flying school based at Salon-de-Provence.

At the outbreak of World War II, only 20 M.S.225s were still in flying condition, the majority of them being scrapped in mid-1940.

Variants
M.S.225
Production variant with a Gnome-Rhone 9Krs engine, 75 built.
M.S.226
Variant fitted with an arrestor hook in 1933 for aircraft carrier operations, powered by a Gnome & Rhône 9Kdr.
M.S.226bis
Variant of the 226 with folding wings first flown in 1934.
M.S.227
Variant used as test bench for the 515 kW (690 hp) Hispano-Suiza 12Xcrs engine, with a four-bladed propeller. 
M.S.275
First flying in 1934, this version had a modified aerofoil and empennage, and was powered by a 515 kW (690 hp) Gnome-Rhône 9Krse; did not enter production. 
M.S.278
Conversion of the M.S.225 equipped with a 388 kW (520 hp) Clerget 14Fcs diesel engine.

Operators

Armee de l'Air
Aeronavale

Three aircraft only.

Specifications (M.S.225)

See also

References

Bibliography

Further reading

Further reading
 Angelucci, Enzo. The Rand McNally Encyclopedia of Military Aircraft, 1914-1980. San Diego, California: The Military Press, 1983. .
 Green, William and Gordon Swanborough. The Complete Book of Fighters. New York:Smithmark, 1994. .
 The Illustrated Encyclopedia of Aircraft (Part Work 1982-1985). London: Orbis Publishing, 1985.
 Taylor, John W. R. and Jean Alexander. Combat Aircraft of the World. New York: G.P. Putnam's Sons, 1969. .

External links

 Aviafrance 
 Avia 

1930s French fighter aircraft
World War II French fighter aircraft
High-wing aircraft
MS.225
Single-engined tractor aircraft